Pedro Miguel Faria Caixinha (born 15 November 1970) is a Portuguese professional football manager, currently in charge of Campeonato Brasileiro Série A club Red Bull Bragantino.

He started coaching in his late twenties, acting an assistant with Sporting CP, Al-Hilal, Panathinaikos, Rapid București and the Saudi Arabia national team. In 2010 he became a full-time manager, going on to work with a host of clubs in several countries, including Santos Laguna (twice), Al-Gharafa, Rangers, Cruz Azul, Al Shabab, Talleres and Red Bull Bragantino.

Football career

Portugal
After an unassuming career as a player, Beja-born Caixinha started managing at the age of 28, his first appointment being with his last club, hometown's C.D. Beja, where he was in charge of his youth sides for four years. In 2003, he moved to the seniors with amateurs Clube de Futebol Vasco da Gama in neighbouring Vidigueira.

After that sole season, Caixinha started a professional relationship with José Peseiro that would last until the end of the decade, with the former acting as assistant to the latter in several clubs – mainly Sporting CP – and the Saudi Arabia national team. In the 2010–11 season he returned to head coaching duties and made his Primeira Liga debut, leading U.D. Leiria to the tenth position.

Caixinha resigned after only three games into the following campaign, amidst rumours of several months due in wages to both him and the players. He quickly signed for fellow league team C.D. Nacional, helping the Madeirans rank seventh after winning ten of his 21 games in charge.

On 11 October 2012, Caixinha resigned after only picking up five points from six league games, which left the club placed second from the bottom in the league.

Santos Laguna
Late into October 2012, Caixinha accepted an offer from Mexico's Santos Laguna. In his first national tournament, he qualified the team for the Clausura Liguilla in the Liga MX and also reached the final of the region's most important club competition, the CONCACAF Champions League.

Caixinha left on 15 August 2015, after winning three major titles.

Rangers
On 11 March 2017, Caixinha joined Scottish Premiership club Rangers on a three-year deal, becoming its 15th permanent manager in the process; caretaker Graeme Murty took control of an Old Firm game played the following day, with Caixinha starting work on 13 March. His debut came five days later, in a 4–0 home win against Hamilton Academical.

On 29 April 2017, Caixinha oversaw a record home defeat for the club against Celtic, by a 1–5 scoreline. On 17 May they lost to Aberdeen at Ibrox for the first time in 26 years, eventually finishing in third place 39 points behind champions Celtic.

To kickstart 2017–18, Caixinha oversaw Rangers in the club's first European campaign since 2012, as they entered the first qualifying round of the UEFA Europa League and faced Luxembourg's FC Progrès Niederkorn, winning 1–0 at home but losing 2–0 away in the reverse fixture against a team that had previously never won a match, and scored only one goal, in European competition. Later that season, he led the side past both Dunfermline Athletic and Partick Thistle in the knockout stages of the Scottish League Cup, before succumbing to a 2–0 defeat at Hampden to Motherwell in the semi-final; the game saw both him and opposing manager Stephen Robinson sent to the stands for their behaviour on the touchline.

On 26 October 2017, after a 1–1 home draw with last-placed Kilmarnock, Caixinha was sacked by Rangers after only 229 days in charge, becoming the shortest-serving manager in the history of the club. His reign was described as "a desperate mess from start to finish", by BBC Scotland's Tom English.

Cruz Azul
On 5 December 2017, Cruz Azul announced the appointment of Caixinha for the upcoming Clausura tournament. His team won the Copa MX in Apertura 2018, with a 2–1 final win over C.F. Monterrey on 31 October. In the same stage, they also reached the league final, where they lost 2–0 on aggregate to Mexico City rival Club América.

Caixinha added another honour on 14 July 2019, winning the Supercopa MX with a 4–0 defeat of Club Necaxa in Los Angeles. In the year's Apertura the side won just twice in the opening eight games, and he resigned on 2 September following a 1–1 draw with C.D. Guadalajara.

Al Shabab
On 20 July 2020, Caixinha signed a two-year contract with Saudi Professional League club Al Shabab FC. The following 5 January, he was dismissed after being ousted from the Arab Club Champions Cup.

Return to Santos Laguna
In December 2021, Caixinha returned to Santos Laguna ahead of the Clausura tournament. He was removed from his post on 24 February after winning one of his eight fixtures, the first leg of a Champions League last 16 elimination by CF Montréal.

Talleres
On 25 March 2022, Caixinha agreed to be the manager of Talleres de Córdoba for the Argentine Primera División season, becoming the first Portuguese to work in the country. He was heavily criticised by pundit Pablo Carrozza for wearing the club kit at his first press conference and promising to not remove it for the duration of his contract, and lost 2–1 on his debut at Club de Gimnasia y Esgrima La Plata.

Caixinha's offer to resign was accepted on 5 September 2022, having won three and lost seven of 16 games for La T, who were ranked 24th of 28. In the Copa Libertadores, he took the team through the group stage and to the last 16 for the first time in their history, where they defeated compatriots Club Atlético Colón 3–1 on aggregate.

Red Bull Bragantino
On 10 December 2022, Caixinha switched countries again after being announced as the new head coach of Campeonato Brasileiro Série A side Red Bull Bragantino. On his debut on 15 January, his team won 1–0 at home to São Paulo FC on the first day of the Campeonato Paulista.

Managerial statistics

Honours
Santos Laguna
Liga MX: Clausura 2015
Copa MX: Apertura 2014
Campeón de Campeones: 2015

Cruz Azul
Copa MX: Apertura 2018
Supercopa MX: 2019

References

External links

1970 births
Living people
People from Beja, Portugal
Sportspeople from Beja District
Portuguese footballers
Association football goalkeepers
C.D. Beja players
Portuguese football managers
Primeira Liga managers
U.D. Leiria managers
C.D. Nacional managers
Liga MX managers
Santos Laguna managers
Cruz Azul managers
Qatar Stars League managers
Al-Gharafa SC managers
Scottish Professional Football League managers
Rangers F.C. managers
Saudi Professional League managers
Al Shabab FC (Riyadh) managers
Argentine Primera División managers
Talleres de Córdoba managers
Campeonato Brasileiro Série A managers
Red Bull Bragantino managers
Portuguese expatriate football managers
Expatriate football managers in Mexico
Expatriate football managers in Qatar
Expatriate football managers in Saudi Arabia
Expatriate football managers in Scotland
Expatriate football managers in Argentina
Expatriate football managers in Brazil
Portuguese expatriate sportspeople in Mexico
Portuguese expatriate sportspeople in Qatar
Portuguese expatriate sportspeople in Saudi Arabia
Portuguese expatriate sportspeople in Scotland
Portuguese expatriate sportspeople in Argentina
Portuguese expatriate sportspeople in Brazil